Mount Henderson is a 6,003 ft (1,830 meter) mountain summit located in the Olympic Mountains, in Mason County of Washington state. It is situated on the shared boundary of Olympic National Park with Mount Skokomish Wilderness. Its nearest higher peak is Mount Skokomish,  to the east-northeast. Precipitation runoff from the mountain drains into the Hamma Hamma River and Skokomish River. The mountain's name honors Louis Forniquet Henderson (1853-1942), a pioneering botanist and mountaineer who accompanied Lieutenant O'Neil on his 1890 expedition into the Olympic Mountains.

Climate
Mount Henderson is located in the marine west coast climate zone of western North America. Most weather fronts originate in the Pacific Ocean, and travel northeast toward the Olympic Mountains. As fronts approach, they are forced upward by the peaks of the Olympic Range, causing them to drop their moisture in the form of rain or snowfall (Orographic lift). As a result, the Olympics experience high precipitation, especially during the winter months. During winter months, weather is usually cloudy, but, due to high pressure systems over the Pacific Ocean that intensify during summer months, there is often little or no cloud cover during the summer. Because of maritime influence, snow tends to be wet and heavy, resulting in avalanche danger.

Geology

The Olympic Mountains are composed of obducted clastic wedge material and oceanic crust, primarily Eocene sandstone, turbidite, and basaltic oceanic crust. The mountains were sculpted during the Pleistocene era by erosion and glaciers advancing and retreating multiple times.

See also

 Geology of the Pacific Northwest
 Geography of Washington (state)

References

External links
 Weather: Mount Henderson
 Mount Skokomish Wilderness U.S. Forest Service
 
 Henderson-Skokomish aerial winter photo: Flickr

Henderson
Henderson
Henderson
Henderson
Henderson